Susan Golombok FBA (born 11 August 1954) is Professor of Family Research and Director of the Centre for Family Research at the University of Cambridge, and Professorial Fellow at Newnham College, Cambridge. Her research on new family forms has contributed to theoretical understanding of family influences on child development and has addressed social and ethical issues that are of relevance to family life.

Personal life and education 

Golombok grew up Glasgow, Scotland, the only child of Clara and Benzion Golombok, and attended Hutchesons' Girls' School. Following a first degree in Psychology at the University of Glasgow in 1976, Susan was awarded a master's degree in Child Development at the University of London, Institute of Education in 1977, and a PhD at the University of London, Institute of Psychiatry in 1982, supervised by Professor Sir Michael Rutter.

Golombok married Professor John Rust in 1979 and they have one son, Jamie Rust, born in 1985.

Career 

Golombok held research positions at the Institute of Psychiatry for 10 years before being appointed to a Lectureship in Psychology at City University, London in 1987 where she established the Family and Child Psychology Research Centre. She became Professor of Family and Child Psychology in 1993. She moved to Cambridge in 2006 to take up the Chair of Family Research and the Directorship of the Centre for Family Research on the retirement of the Founder, Professor Martin Richards. In 2005, she was Visiting Professor at Columbia University, New York, and in 2019, she was Visiting Distinguished Scholar at the Williams Institute, UCLA.

Research 
Golombok has pioneered research on lesbian mother families, gay father families, single mothers by choice, and families created by assisted reproductive technologies including in vitro fertilisation (IVF), donor insemination, egg donation and surrogacy. She conducted one of the first studies worldwide of children in lesbian mother families in the 1970s and of children born by assisted reproduction in the 1980s. Her research has challenged popular myths and assumptions about the social and psychological consequences for children of being raised in new family forms, and has advanced theoretical understanding of parental influences on child development more generally by showing that the quality of family relationships and the social context of the family are more influential in children's psychological development than are the number, gender, sexual orientation or biological relatedness of their parents.

Impact of research on policy and legislation 

Golombok's research has informed policy and legislation on new family forms in the UK and internationally. She has been invited to give evidence to regulatory bodies including the Dutch State Commission on Family Law, the Swedish Government Inquiry on Surrogate Motherhood, the UK Law Commission, and the French National Assembly Parliamentary Committee on Bioethics.

She was a member of the UK government's surrogacy review committee in the late 1990s, a member of the Nuffield Council on Bioethics Working Party on Donor Conception in 2012–13, and is currently a member of the International Commission on the Clinical Use of Human Germline Genome Editing.

Her research has been used as evidence in same-sex marriage legislation in a number of countries, including the US Supreme Court ruling in 2015, and in legislation on assisted reproduction such as the UK Human Fertilisation and Embryology Act 2008 that allowed same-sex parents to be joint legal parents of children born through assisted reproduction, and the 2019 amendment that facilitated single parents becoming the legal parents of children born through surrogacy.

Publications

Publications by Golombok
Parenting: What really counts? (Routledge, 2000)
Modern Families: Parents and Children in New Family Forms (Cambridge University Press, 2015).
We are Family: what really matters for parents and children (Scribe, 2020)

Publications co-authored by Golombok
Bottling it Up (Faber & Faber, 1985)
Gender Development (Cambridge University Press, 1994)
Modern Psychometrics: The Science of Psychological Assessment (Routledge, 1989)
Growing up in a Lesbian Family (Guilford, 1997)

Awards
Modern Families won the British Psychological Society 2016 Academic Monograph Prize
Modern Families received an Honourable Mention in the US PROSE Awards 2016

References

External links 
 Professor Susan Golombok
 Professor Susan Golombok

Academics from Glasgow
Living people
1954 births
Alumni of the University of Glasgow
Alumni of the University of London
Academics of the University of Cambridge